Anthony Snobeck (born 20 April 1983) is a French professional golfer, who has played on both the European and Challenge Tours.

Biography
Snobeck was born in Paris; his father Dany was a successful racing driver who won the French Supertouring Championship three times and the Andros Trophy twice, and the family lived adjacent to Magny-Cours, where he owned a car company. Snobeck began playing golf in 1995, and by the age of seventeen was a three-handicap. He began being coached by Antoine Lebouc, former European Tour player and husband of Patricia Meunier-Lebouc, in 2002, and under his guidance turned professional in 2005. After a season on the Alps Tour, Snobeck recorded his first win as a professional at the 2006 Tessali-Metaponto Open di Puglia e Basilicata on the Challenge Tour, and finished the season at 23rd on the rankings, just outside the top twenty graduates. However, Snobeck did belatedly reach the top-tier European Tour in 2009, by coming through the Qualifying School. His 2009 season was a struggle, however, and he made only four cuts, with a best finish of T23rd, before returning to the Challenge Tour. He picked up his second victory at that level in 2011.

Professional wins (2)

Challenge Tour wins (2)

Challenge Tour playoff record (1–0)

See also
2008 European Tour Qualifying School graduates
2012 European Tour Qualifying School graduates

Team appearances
Amateur
European Youths' Team Championship (representing France): 2002, 2004

References

External links

French male golfers
European Tour golfers
Golfers from Paris
Sportspeople from Lyon
1983 births
Living people
20th-century French people
21st-century French people